Cremnophora is a monotypic moth genus of the family Noctuidae erected by George Hampson in 1901. Its only species, Cremnophora angasii, was first described by George French Angas in 1847. It is found in South Australia.

References

Agaristinae
Monotypic moth genera